Elke Josselinne Karsten (born 15 May 1995) is an Argentine handball player for Molde Elite and the Argentina women's national handball team.

She defended Argentina at the 2013 World Women's Handball Championship in Serbia.

Achievements
Norwegian Cup:
Finalist: 2021

Individual awards
2014 Pan American Women's Junior Handball Championship: All Star Team Right Back
2019 Pan American Games: Top scorer
2021 South and Central American Women's Handball Championship: All star team right back

References

External links

1995 births
Living people
Argentine people of Swiss descent
Argentine people of German descent
Argentine female handball players
People from Quilmes
Handball players at the 2016 Summer Olympics
Olympic handball players of Argentina
Pan American Games medalists in handball
Pan American Games silver medalists for Argentina
Handball players at the 2015 Pan American Games
Handball players at the 2019 Pan American Games
Expatriate handball players
Argentine expatriate sportspeople in Hungary
Argentine expatriate sportspeople in Spain
Medalists at the 2015 Pan American Games
Medalists at the 2019 Pan American Games
Sportspeople from Buenos Aires Province
21st-century Argentine women